Henry Edward Williamson (February 16, 1912 – January 13, 1991) was an American football coach and educator. He was the first head football Florida State University, serving for one season, in 1947. Williamson was also an assistant professor of physical education at Florida State.

Williamson was born in Atlanta, Georgia and moved to Tallahassee, Florida at the age of one. He attended Leon High School in Tallahassee and then the University of Florida, where he played college football as an end. He coached high school football in North Florida before serving in the United States Navy as a gunnery officer during World War II.

Williamson died of cancer in 1991.

Head coaching record

References

1912 births
1991 deaths
20th-century American educators
Florida Gators football players
Florida State Seminoles football coaches
Florida State University faculty
High school football coaches in Florida
United States Navy officers
United States Navy personnel of World War II
Leon High School alumni
Deaths from cancer in Florida
Coaches of American football from Florida
Players of American football from Atlanta
Players of American football from Tallahassee, Florida
Educators from Florida
Military personnel from Florida